Macedonianism may refer to:
 Macedonian nationalism, a 19th- and 20th-century social movement
 Pneumatomachi or Semi-Arians, a 4th-century anti-Nicene Christian sect

See also 
 Macedonist (disambiguation)